Zhang Ruoxu (ca. 660 – ca. 720) was a Chinese poet of the early Tang dynasty from Yangzhou in modern Jiangsu province. He is best known for "Spring River in the Flower Moon Night" (Chun Jiang Hua Yue Ye, 春江花月夜), one of the most unique and influential Tang poems, which has inspired numerous later artworks.

Life
Zhang Ruoxu was a native of Yangzhou in modern Jiangsu province, and served as a minor military officer in Yanzhou in modern Shandong.  Little is known about his life today. He is traditionally grouped with He Zhizhang, Zhang Xu, and Bao Rong as the Four Poets of Central Wu, the Lower Yangtze region.

Poetry
Only two of Zhang Ruoxu's poems are extant, but one of them, "Spring River in the Flower Moon Night" (Chun Jiang Hua Yue Ye, 春江花月夜), has long been well known and considered an extraordinary work. The poem can be divided into nine quatrains and three sections. The first section describes the scenery of the moonlit Yangtze River in spring. The second and third lament the ephemerality of life, as well as the sorrow of travellers and the loved ones they leave behind. The poem marks a stylistic break from the poetry of the preceding Six Dynasties, and anticipates the content and style of High Tang poetry.

Legacy
One of the most unique poems of the Tang dynasty, "Spring River in the Flower Moon Night" is included in virtually all historical surveys of Tang poetry. The influential 20th-century poet Wen Yiduo was especially enthusiastic in his praise, calling it "the poem of all poems, the summit of all summits."

Zhang Ruoxu's poem has inspired numerous later artworks. The composer Peng Xiuwen created a piece of orchestral music with the same name, which has since entered the classical repertoire for the traditional Chinese instrument guzheng. It was the largest work of calligraphy made in Hong Kong, and has been donated to the art museum.

References

Bibliography

Further reading
François Cheng (1970), L'Analyse formelle de l'œuvre poétique d'un auteur des Tang, Zhang Ruo-Xu , Mouton

Usage in Music
Free HD Video Recording of Variations on "Spring River in the Flower Moon Night" from American Solo Harpist Jieyin Wu

Tang dynasty poets
7th-century Chinese poets
8th-century Chinese poets
660 births
720 deaths
Writers from Yangzhou
Poets from Jiangsu